The chestnut-rumped woodcreeper (Xiphorhynchus pardalotus) is a species of perching bird. Like the other woodcreepers, it belongs to the  subfamily Dendrocolaptinae of the ovenbird family (Furnariidae).

It is found in Brazil, French Guiana, Guyana, Suriname, and Venezuela. Its natural habitats are subtropical or tropical moist lowland forests and subtropical or tropical moist montane forests.

References

chestnut-rumped woodcreeper
Birds of Venezuela
Birds of the Guianas
Birds of the Amazon Basin
chestnut-rumped woodcreeper
Taxa named by Louis Jean Pierre Vieillot
Taxonomy articles created by Polbot